Lesley Anne Ivory is a painter who generally paints cats, and is best known for her Ivory Cats. She has illustrated more than 40 children's books.

She was born Lesley Anne Revill in 1934 in Luton, Bedfordshire, UK. Her father was a dental surgeon and her mother a textile designer. She attended St. Alban's School of Art, specialising in fabric design and wood engraving.

She rose to fame in the 1980s, following time spent developing her illustrative abilities with many freelance commissions. It is for her 'Ivory Cats' with highly detailed studies of cats on rich and decorative backgrounds that have made her work popular on merchandise for nearly three decades, from plates, greeting cards, kitchenware through to wristwatches, fine china and wall calendars.  She has taken part in exhibitions, including three one-woman shows in London, annual shows at the Chris Beetles Gallery in London  and at Salisbury Museum in Wiltshire. In 1993, she had a major exhibition in New York. Her wood engravings were exhibited at the Summer Exhibition of the Royal Academy for a consecutive decade. She also created a set of limited edition prints of animals for the World Wildlife Fund. She is also one of the patrons of the UK-based Cat Action Trust.

The range of merchandise featuring the Ivory Cats is extensive and includes hundreds of items from the US, UK and Europe in addition to being an expending market in Japan. It has appeared on merchandise from Danbury Mint, Hunky Dory, Enesco, Past Times, and many others. Today her work can be seen on Flame Tree calendars, Halcyon Days boxes, and Wentworth Wooden Jigsaws. Her work is exhibited at the Chris Beetles Gallery.
 
In 2015, Lesley commissioned her first website. Lesley and her husband, artist Evan Ivory, live in Hertfordshire, England. The Ivory's have two sons and two grand-daughters.

Books written
Ivory has written many books.
1988: Cats Know Best. Cats (written by Colin Eisler)
1988: Kittens – Pop-up book
1989: Meet my Cats
1989: PostCats
1990: Tiny Kittens – Pop-up book
1991: Little Angels – Pop-up book
1991: Cats in the Sun
1992: Book of Cats
1992: Collectable Cats
1992: Perfect Little Cats
1992: Glorious Cats
1993: The Birthday Cat
1995: Cat and Carols
1995: Cats Amongst the Toys
1991: Christmas Cats
1998: Star Cats: A Feline Zodiac
2001: Cats
2007: Home is Where the Cat Is

References

British writers
British painters
1934 births
People from Luton
Living people